Gloucester Fishermen's Wives Association (GFWA), also known as the Fishermen's Wives of  Gloucester (Association), is a non-profit organization "promoting the New England fishing industry, helping to preserve the Atlantic Ocean as a food supply for the world, and assisting active and retired fishermen and their families to live better lives".

History 

The Gloucester Fishermen's Wives Association (GFWA) was formed in 1969 and was initially called the United Fishermen's Wives Organization of Gloucester, informally "the Wives", changing its name to GFWA in 1977.  The GFWA started as a group of primarily Sicilian American women, many first-generation immigrants, and initially focused on concerns of local fishermen. However, in the late 1970s the GFWA became active at the state, federal, and international levels as well, lobbying for fisheries conservation and management legislation. GWFA also produced two successful cookbooks and held events throughout New England to promote fishing and protect fishing stock by teaching the public to use species of fish popular in Sicilian cooking, but underused in American. As the work of the GFWA expanded, the group created two sister organizations: Gloucester Fishermen's Wives Memorial, Incorporated (GFWM) in 1982, and Gloucester Fishermen's Wives Development Programs (GFWDP) in 1995. The GFWA continues to promote Gloucester, Massachusetts, the oldest fishing port in the nation, "for its beauty and the culture of the people on its working waterfront", and is an "international model for conserving and protecting fish stocks and a working waterfront for future generations."

Recent work 

In 2009 the group started a community supported fishery project - following the community-supported agriculture or CSA model—in which participants buy a share of the year's catch. The Cape Ann Fresh Catch has continued to support local events highlighting the importance of sustainable fisheries, such as the annual "Seafood Throwdown".

Memorials 

The group, with its sister group GWFM, raised funds for a statue by local Gloucester sculptor Morgan Faulds Pike marking its contributions to the Gloucester community, as well as the role of the fisherman's wife in maintaining households and economies in the community; the statue was dedicated in 2001.

Publications 

The GFWA has published three cookbooks:
 The Taste of Gloucester: a fisherman's wife cooks (1976)
 The Fishermen's Wives' cookbook: 185 seafood recipes (1979)
 Gloucester fishermen's wives' cookbook: stories and recipes (2005)

References

External links 
 Records of the Fishermen's Wives of Gloucester at Schlesinger Library, Radcliffe Institute, Harvard University.

Non-profit organizations based in Massachusetts
Organizations established in 1969
Gloucester, Massachusetts
Fisheries conservation organizations
1969 establishments in Massachusetts
Women in Massachusetts